Mesa Natural Gas Solutions (MNGS) is a company based in Casper, Wyoming. Mesa specializes in natural gas or liquid propane powered mobile generators. Most Mesa Generators are currently used in oil and gas applications, including as Flare Gas Recovery Systems (FGRS).

Current operations

Mesa Natural Gas Solutions' natural gas generators currently power oil and gas plays in North America, and some international basins.
Evansville, Wyoming,
Cheyenne, Wyoming,
Killdeer, North Dakota,
Alva, Oklahoma,
Carlsbad, New Mexico,
Midland, Texas,
Pecos, Texas

Veteran, Reserve & National Guard Workforce

The company's Current CEO, Scott Gromer, spent 23 years in the Army and retired as a Major from the Wyoming Army National Guard. Additionally, over 60% of the company’s founders and leadership are veterans of the United States military and continue to serve in the Reserves and National Guard.

The company's first CEO, Jakob Norman, is a veteran of the United States Air Force, United States Army, and Wyoming National Guard where he obtained the rank of Colonel and currently serves as a Regimental Commander.  Jakob Norman was the CEO from the inception of the company through October 2016. 

The company received the prestigious Secretary of Defense Freedom award in 2017 for Mesa’s efforts in 2014, 2015, and 2016 in support of the Guard and Reserves (the award was for the period of October 1, 2015 through September 30, 2016). The Secretary of Defense Employer Support Freedom Award is the highest recognition given by the U.S. Government to employers for their support of their employees who serve in the Guard and Reserve.

References

Final thoughts: Grants, seats, veterans
Casper company's gas-powered engines could reduce flaring
 May 2016
Earrings, trophies and packaged meals: How Casper oilmen are surviving the bust
CEO will share story of local natural gas generator company
About Us
Mesa Natural Gas is finalist for DOD award - Wyoming Business Report

Companies based in Wyoming
American companies established in 2014
2014 establishments in Wyoming